Pape Macou Sarr (born 25 July 1991) is a Senegalese professional footballer who currently plays for Olympia Radotín.

Club career 
He started his career in Senegal with ASC Diaraf, before joining Angers in the summer of 2013.
In February 2015 Sarr signed a deal with Slovak side DAC Dunajská Streda. He returned to France, to Laval in June 2017. After one season in Laval he was loaned to L'Entente SSG, but quit this arrangement without playing a game, after less than a month, and subsequently left Laval after termination of this contract.

Olympia Radotín

References

External links 
 
 
 

1991 births
Living people
Sportspeople from Thiès
Senegalese footballers
Association football midfielders
ASC Jaraaf players
Angers SCO players
Ligue 2 players
Championnat National players
FC DAC 1904 Dunajská Streda players